"Bad Religion" is a song by Godsmack. It served as the fourth and final single from their eponymous debut album.

Meaning
According to Godsmack vocalist Sully Erna, a practicing Wiccan, the song has an anti-abortion message.  Erna says, "You don't even know me, yet you're deciding to kill me? Look, I'm here. I'm alive inside you. I can't be ignored."

Appearances
Following the September 11, 2001 attacks, radio conglomerate Clear Channel Communications issued the 2001 Clear Channel memorandum, a list of 150 songs Clear Channel recommended to be removed from airplay. "Bad Religion" was on the list.

The song was also remade by Dale Oliver as an entrance song for TNA tag team The Naturals.

The song was featured in ATV Quad Power Racing 2 for PlayStation 2, Xbox and GameCube. It was also featured in the 2003 film Mayor of the Sunset Strip.

Personnel
 Sully Erna – vocals, rhythm guitar, drums
 Tony Rombola – lead guitars, additional vocals
 Robbie Merrill – bass
 Andrew Murdock – producer

Chart positions 

Singles U.S. Billboard

References 

1998 songs
Godsmack songs
Songs about abortion
Songs written by Sully Erna
Republic Records singles